Vidyapati ( – 1460), also known by the sobriquet Maithil Kavi Kokil (the poet cuckoo of Maithili), was a Maithili and Sanskrit polymath-poet-saint, playwright, composer, biographer, philosopher, law-theorist, writer, courtier and royal priest. He was a devotee of Shiva, but also wrote love songs and devotional Vaishnava songs. He knew Sanskrit, Prakrit, Apabhramsha, and Maithili.

Vidyapati's influence was not just restricted to Maithili and Sanskrit literature but also extended to other Eastern Indian literary traditions.
The language at the time of Vidyapati, the prakrit-derived late Abahattha, had just begun to transition into early versions of the Eastern language such as Maithili . Thus, Vidyapati's influence on making these languages has been described as "analogous to that of Dante in Italy and Chaucer in England". He has been called the "Father of Bengali literature".

Early life
Vidyapati was born to a Maithil Brahmin family in the village of Bisapī (now Bisfi) in the present-day Madhubani district of the Mithila region of northern Bihar, India. The name Vidyapati ("master of knowledge") is derived from two Sanskrit words, vidya ("knowledge") and pati ("master"). There is confusion as to his exact date of birth due to conflicting information from his own works and those of his patrons.

He was the son of Gaṇapati Ṭhakkura, a Maithil Brahmin said to be a great devotee of Shiva. He was a priest in the court of Rāya Gaṇeśvara, the reigning chief of Tirhut. A number of his near ancestors were notable in their own right including his great-grandfather, Devāditya Ṭhakkura, who was a Minister of War and Peace in the court of Harisimhadeva.

Vidyapati himself worked in the courts of various kings of the Oiniwar Dynasty of Mithila. Vidyapati's first commission was by Kīrttisiṃha, who ruled Mithila from around 1370 to 1380. This led to the Kīrttilatā, a long praise-poem for his patron in verse. This work contains an extended passage praising the courtesans of Delhi, foreshadowing his later virtuosity in composing love poetry. Though Kīrttisiṃha didn't commission any more works, Vidyapati secured a position at the court of his successor, Devasimha. The prose story collection Bhūparikramaṇa was written under Devasimha's auspices. Vidyapati developed a close friendship with Devasimha's heir apparent Sivasimha and started focusing on love songs. He wrote some five hundred love songs, primarily between 1380 and 1406. The songs he composed after that period were devotional praises of Shiva, Vishnu, Durga, and Ganga.

There was a close friendship between Sivasimha, king of Mithila from 1402 to 1406, and Vidyapati. As soon as Sivasimha ascended to his throne, he granted Vidyapati his home village of Bisapi, an act recorded on a copper plate. On the plate, Sivasimha calls him "the new Jayadeva". The poet also accompanied his king to Delhi, at the sultan's demand. A story about that encounter relates how the king was held by the sultan and Vidyapati negotiated for his release by displaying his clairvoyant powers. Sivasimha's favorable patronage and the courtly environment encouraged Vidyapati's experiments in love songs written in Maithili, a language everyone at court could enjoy. In 1406, Sivasimha went missing in a battle with a Muslim army. After this defeat, Vidyapati and the court took refuge at a king's court in Rajabanauli(also known as Banauli), in modern-day Nepal. In 1418, Padmasimha succeeded Sivasimha as ruler of Mithila after an interregnum when Sivasimha's chief queen Lakhima Devi reigned for 12 years. Vidyapati returned to serve Padmasimha and continue writing, primarily treatises on law and devotional manuals.

At about 1430 or earlier, he is known to have returned to his village, Bisapi. He often visited its temple of Shiva.

He is recorded as having two wives, three sons and four daughters.

Political career 
The independence of the kings Vidyapati worked for was often threatened by incursions by Muslim sultans. The Kīrttilatā makes reference to an incident where the Oiniwar King, Raja Gaṇeśvara, was killed by the Turkish commander, Malik Arsalan in 1371. By 1401, Vidyapati requested the help of the Jaunpur Sultan in overthrowing Arsalan and installing Gaṇeśvara's sons, Vīrasiṃha and Kīrttisiṃha, on the throne. With the Sultan's assistance, Arsalan was deposed and Kīrttisiṃha, the oldest son, became the ruler of Mithila.

The conflicts of his time are evident in his works. In his early praise-poem Kīrttilatā, he slyly criticizes his patron for his perceived deference to Muslims.

Love songs 
While working under his second patron, Devasimha, and especially under his successor Sivasimha, Vidyapati started composing Maithili songs of the love of Radha and Krishna. He seems to have only composed love songs between 1380 and 1406, though he kept writing until near his death in 1448. He seems to have ceased writing love songs after his patron and friend Sivasimha went missing in a battle and his court had to go into exile. These songs, which would eventually number five hundred, broke with convention. They were written in vernacular Maithili as songs, not as formal poems in literary Sanskrit as was done before. Until Vidyapati, Maithili wasn't employed as a literary medium.

He applied the tradition of Sanskrit love poetry to the "simple, musical, and direct" Maithili language. His inheritance from the Sanskrit tradition include its repertory of standard images to describe beauty ("eyes large and tender like a doe's") and standard settings to invoke certain moods and feelings (spring with its increasing heat as an analogy for rising passion). Vidyapati also drew from the beauty of his home in Madhubani ("forest of honey"), with its mango groves, rice fields, sugar cane, and lotus ponds.

In the tradition of Jayadeva's Gita Govinda, Vidyapati's songs were simultaneously praises of love-making and praises of Krishna; praise of Krishna involved praise of love-making. The intensity and poetic virtuosity of the songs were integral to these songs' function as a way to directly worship god and earn spiritual merit. Vidyapati's continuation of Jayadeva's program in a different language earned him the title "the new Jayadeva". His work did differ from his predecessor's in two ways. His songs were independent from one another unlike the Gita Govinda, which comprises twelve cantos telling an overarching story of the couple's separation and reunion. While Jayadeva wrote from Krishna's perspective, Vidyapati preferred Radha's; "her career as a young girl, her slowly awakening youth, her physical charm, her shyness, doubts and hesitations, her naive innocence, her need for love, her surrender to rapture, her utter anguish when neglected – all of these are described from a woman's point of view and with matchless tenderness."

These songs frequently mention the queens of king Sivasimha, an indicator that they were meant to be enjoyed by the court. At times, his poems identify Krishna with king Sivasimha and Radha with the king's chief queen, Lakhima Devi. They were sung by a court singer, Jayati, who sent the songs to music. They were learned by dancing girls and eventually spread out of the court.

His love songs have been collected into the Padāvalī, probably not by Vidyapati himself.

Devotional songs 

Though he wrote hundreds of love songs about the romance of Radha and Krishna, he was not a special devotee of Krishna or Vishnu. Instead, he lavished attention on Shiva and Durga but also wrote songs about Vishnu and Ganga. He is particularly known for his songs of the love of Shiva and Parvati and prayers for Shiva as the supreme Brahman.

A song titled All My Inhibition:All my inhibition left me in a flash,
When he robbed me off my clothes,
But his body became my new dress.
Like a bee hovering on a lotus leaf
He was there in my night, on me!

Influence

Odia literature 
Vidyapati's influence reached Odisha through Bengal. The earliest composition in Brajabuli, an artificial literary language popularized by Vidyapati, is ascribed to Ramananda Raya, the governor of Godavari province of the King of Odisha, Gajapati Prataprudra Dev. He was a disciple of Chaitanya Mahaprabhu. He recited his Brajabuli poems to Chaitanya Mahaprabhu, when he first met him on the bank of river Godavari at Rajahmundry, southern provincial capital of Kingdom of Odisha.

Bengali literature 
Bengali Vaishnavas like Chitanya and Chandidas adopted Vidyapati's love songs about Radha and Krishna as Vaishnava hymns. All major Bengali poets of the medieval period were influenced by Vidyapati. As a result, an artificial literary language, known as Brajabuli was developed in the sixteenth century. Brajabuli is basically Maithili (as prevalent during the medieval period) but its forms are modified to look like Bengali. The medieval Bengali poets, Gobindadas Kabiraj, Jnandas, Balaramdas and Narottamdas composed their padas (poems) in this language. Rabindranath Tagore composed his Bhanusingha Thakurer Padabali (1884) in a mix of Western Hindi (Braj Bhasha) and archaic Bengali and named the language Brajabuli as an imitation of Vidyapati (he initially promoted these lyrics as those of a newly discovered poet, Bhanusingha). Other 19th-century figures in the Bengal Renaissance like Bankim Chandra Chatterjee have also written in Brajabuli.

Tagore was much influenced by Vidyapati. He set the poet's Bhara Badara to his own tune. A bridge in Kolkata near Sealdah Station is named after him (Vidyapati Setu).

Legacy 
Vidyapati has been kept alive in popular memory over the past six centuries; he is a household name in Mithila. His love songs are sung at weddings in the region. Many myths have arisen about him and people continue to sing his songs.

Bidāpat Nāch 
A form of folk dance-drama street theater, Bidāpat Nāch, where "bidāpat" is derived from "Vidyapati", is performed in Purnia district in north Bihar. While several groups performed in multiple villages in that area in the 20th century, there was just one group left in one village by 2012.

In mythology 
Vidyapati's life has been mythologised in different ways. Many of his admirers ascribe miracles to him and detail his interaction with the gods. Among these stories is one which details that Shiva came down to earth to speak with Vidyapati after being impressed with his piety. This incarnation of Lord Shiva is known as Ugna. Ugna served as the servant of the poet Vidyapati.

Another story tells of story involving him and the Goddess Ganga. When his death was imminent, he decided to go to the river Ganga, but was too tired to continue just a few miles away. He resolves that if his piety was pure, the river would come to him. And so it happens. The goddess obliges and the river rises to let him take a final dip in holy waters. At some point in the past, the town where this is believed to have happened was renamed Vidyapati Nagar ("town of Vidyapati") and a Shiva temple was built there.

In popular culture 
Pahari Sanyal played Vidyapati in the 1937 Bengali film Vidyapati, which received a lot of appreciation. The film starred Prithviraj Kapoor as King Shiva Singha of Mithila. Another film, also titled Vidyapati, was made in 1964 by Prahlad Sharma, starring Bharat Bhushan and Simi Garewal in the lead roles.

In Dec 2018, Darbhanga Airport was renamed Kavi Kokil Vidyapati Airport. Darbhanga MP Gopal Jee Thakur had several times demanded to rename the Darbhanga Airport as “Kavi Kokil Baba Vidyapati Airport” in the Parliament as well as from Prime Minister of India Narendra Modi.

Works

Texts
Maṇimañjarīnāṭikā (Sanskrit, Tirahuta script) – a conventional romantic play (nāṭikā)
Bhūparikramaṇa ("around the world", Sanskrit, Devanagari script) – a collection of eight prose stories set in different locales
 (Avahaṭṭha, Devanagari script) – a praise-biography in verse detailing the victory of Vidyapati's patron Kirttisimha's over his rival Malik Arsalan composed in the Sanskrit genre ākhyāyikā.
 (Sanskrit, Devanagari script) – a treatise on political ethics and ideal masculinity, composed broadly in the Sanskrit kathā genre.
Gorakṣavijaya (Sanskrit, Prakrit, and Maithili; Mithilākṣara script) – a musical play about Tantric saint Gorakṣanātha rescuing his teacher Matsyendranātha from a worldly life back to the life of a yogi
Kīrttipatākā (Avahaṭṭha, Tirahutā script) – a partially-extant praise-biography in verse for another of Vidyapati's patrons, Sivasimha.
Harikeli (Avahaṭṭha, Tirahutā script) – a partially-extant allegorical love play between Krishna and the Gopis, with Raya Arjuna/Jagat Simha (a cousin of Sivasimha) as protagonist.
Likhanāvalī (Sanskrit, Devanagari script) – a manual for scribes, with model letters, business documents, and affidavits
Śaivasarvasvasāra (Sanskrit; one manuscript in Mithilākṣara script, two in Devanagari) – describes the significance and merits of worshipping Shiva, with proscribed rituals, citing extensively from the Puranas.
Gaṅgāvākyāvalī (Sanskrit) – a text glorifying the religious significance of Ganga, with citations from the Puranas.
 (Sanskrit, Tirahuta script) – a dharmaśāstra focusing on property law, with citations from many Smritis.
 (Sanskrit, Devanagari script) – a guide to types of ritual donations and their spiritual merits
 (Sanskrit, Devanagari script) – a guide to the proper worship of Durga, especially during Navaratri or in the month of Asvin.
Gayāpattalaka (Sanskrit, Devanagari script) – a text about funerary rituals.
 (Sanskrit) – a text describing the festivals that are to be observed through the year (probably the festivals that were observed in Mithila at that time).
Padāvalī (Maithili, Tirahuta/Bangla/Devanagari scripts depending on version) – a compilation of Vidyapati's songs in praise of Krishna, likely not put together by him.

Translations 
His works have been translated to several languages, including English. Vidyapati's love songs were translated into English as part of the UNESCO Collection of Representative Works.

Notes

Bibliography

Further reading

External links

 Vidyapati at Encyclopædia Universalis
 Vidyapati at the Great Soviet Encyclopedia
 
 27 poems transl. Deben Bhattacharya, from Love Songs of Vidyapati, (UNESCO) 1963

1350s births
1440s deaths
Hindu poets
14th-century Indian poets
People from Madhubani district
Culture of Mithila
Writers of Mithila
Maithili poets
15th-century Indian poets
Maithil Brahmin